Virtual Light is a science fiction novel by American-Canadian writer William Gibson, the first book in his Bridge trilogy. Virtual Light is a science-fiction novel set in a postmodern, dystopian, cyberpunk future. The term 'Virtual Light' was coined by scientist Stephen Beck to describe a form of instrumentation that produces optical sensations directly in the eye without the use of photons. The novel was a finalist nominee for a Hugo Award, and shortlisted for the Locus Award in 1994.

Plot summary
The plot centers around Chevette Washington, a young bicycle messenger who lives in the ad hoc, off-the-grid community that has grown on the San Francisco-Oakland Bay Bridge in the aftermath of a devastating earthquake.

Chevette, on a whim, steals a pair of dark-rimmed glasses from a man at a party because she is offended by his demeanor. Soon after, she realizes that the glasses have unlikely importance, as security company henchmen begin tracking and following her. Among the pursuers are Svobodov and Orlovsky, two Russian immigrants who reside in San Francisco and are employed as cops, as well as Loveless, a ruthless corporate hitman with gold canine teeth. The glasses contain plans by a powerful corporation to rebuild San Francisco entirely using nanotechnology, and for that reason, they are highly coveted and present a danger to the person who possesses them.

Meanwhile, Berry Rydell, a former cop turned private security agent, is contracted to recover the pair of glasses for Lucius Warbaby, an intimidating and presumably successful "skip-tracer", a sort of bondsman/bounty hunter.  When Rydell is given the mission, he is not informed of the significance of the glasses and the information they contain.

Eventually, the plot climaxes when Rydell, Loveless, Warbaby, Orlovsky, and Svobodov all catch up with Chevette. The cops want the glasses, as does Rydell. Realizing the inherent danger of the situation, Rydell is forced to decide whom to side with.  He decides to fight off Orlovsky and Svobodov and shirk his agreement with Warbaby.  Instead, Rydell runs off with Chevette, and they embark upon a wild and treacherous journey in which they must remain one step ahead of their enemies, who have all the advantages of wealth and technology on their side. A subplot also focuses on a romantic relationship between Chevette and Rydell, which is initially restricted because of the nature of their circumstances, but is eventually allowed to flourish.

Another subplot focuses on a Japanese sociologist named Shinya Yamazaki, who is currently studying the bridge dwellers and the history of their settlement. The subplot largely focuses on his interactions with Skinner, an old man who lives in a shack high atop one of the bridge's support pylons, who happens to share his home with Chevette.

Setting
The setting is California in 2006, part of a dystopian world where the middle class has essentially evaporated leaving only multinational corporations and their exorbitantly rich elite and the poor who are mostly security officers, couriers, or otherwise work in minor service positions. Many of the poor live illegally and entirely outside the normal economy in places like The Bridge engaged in dubious enterprises such as theft, drugs, weapons, gambling, prostitution, and operation of unlicensed restaurants and doctor's offices. Others pursue livelihood in innocuous yet unregulated commerce such as by running antique shops and barbershops.

Themes
A major theme of Virtual Light is class conflict; Warbaby and the elite are placed against Rydell and Chevette.  The elite see themselves as inherently superior, and view the underclass as amoral, ruthless, and dispensable.  Another important element, which is common to cyberpunk, is the idea of the power structure withholding information from the general population.  The information, in this case, are the plans to rebuild an entire city completely, regardless of what its inhabitants think, reminiscent of Haussmann's renovation of Paris.

Main characters
Chevette Washington, a bike messenger with a rough past and uncertain future; she was abused as a child by her mother's boyfriend.  At one point she was imprisoned, but escaped and was able to find a job as a courier.
Berry Rydell, a private security officer who has drifted from one job to another ever since his killing of a suspect and subsequent lawsuit by the man's family cost him his job as a police officer.
Lucius Warbaby, a bounty hunter hired to retrieve the stolen glasses by the corporation that made them. He in turn hires Rydell to assist him in finding the person who stole them. Due to a recent rollerblading injury, he requires a cane to walk.
Freddie, Warbaby's assistant. He has a fondness for loud, bright-colored print shirts, and carries a laptop with him wherever he goes.
Loveless, an agent sent by the company that made the glasses to retrieve them and kill whoever stole them. His most distinguishing features are his four gold canine teeth, visible at the corners of his mouth whenever he smiles.
Sublett, one of Rydell's fellow security guards. He is an albino with severe chemical allergies, and is a member of a Christian religious sect that views certain movies and television shows as a new form of gospel.
Sammy Sal Dupree, Chevette's friend who set her up with her courier job at Allied and tries to convince her to get rid of the glasses. He is presumed to be killed by Loveless halfway through the story, but it is revealed near the end that he survived.
Skinner, an old man that Chevette lives with.  She helps him around the house, and together they also sell odds and ends to people for extra money.
Lowell, Chevette's old boyfriend who has ties to the Republic of Desire hacking ring.
Shinya Yamazaki, a Japanese national who describes himself as an "existential sociologist", currently studying the inhabitants of The Bridge.
Svobodov and Orlovsky, corrupt San Francisco cops who pursue Chevette in an attempt to obtain the glasses.

References

External links
 Virtual Light at Worlds Without End

1994 American novels
Cyberpunk novels
Dystopian novels
Novels by William Gibson
1994 science fiction novels
American science fiction novels
Bridge trilogy
Novels set in the San Francisco Bay Area
Fiction set in 2006
Viking Press books